Pasir Puteh District is a district (jajahan) in Kelantan, Malaysia. The town of Pasir Putih is situated on the bank of Semerak River, about 30 kilometers to the south of Kota Bharu. Pasir Puteh district borders Terengganu to its south-east.

History
Before this place was known as Pasir Puteh, it was known as Pangkalan Limbungan. The town of Pasir Puteh derived its name after Sultan Muhammad IV visited. The Sultan was very impressed to see the white sand shining along the riverbanks. Hence in 1911, the Sultan declared the name of this place as Pasir Puteh, which meant white sand. This is the place where a Kelantan warrior, Tok Janggut, raised an army of Malay warriors to oppose the introduction of taxation in Kelantan.

Education
Several types of schools can be found in Pasir Puteh. Among the schools in Pasir Puteh are:
Sekolah Menengah Kebangsaan Bukit Jawa
Sekolah Menengah Kebangsaan Cherang Ruku
Sekolah Menengah Kebangsaan Gaal
Sekolah Menengah Kebangsaan Jeram
Sekolah Menengah Kebangsaan Kamil
Sekolah Menengah Kebangsaan Dato' Ismail
Sekolah Menengah Kebangsaan Seri Aman
Sekolah Menengah Kebangsaan Sri Maharaja
Sekolah Menengah Kebangsaan Tok Janggut
Sekolah Menengah Kebangsaan Padang Pak Amat
Sekolah Menengah Sains Pasir Puteh

The pre-university institute, which is Kolej Matrikulasi Kelantan (KMKt) also located within this district.

Demographics

Population in Pasir Puteh is about 117,383 (2010).

Ranking Population of Jajahan Pasir Puteh.

Federal Parliament and State Assembly Seats 

List of LMS district representatives in the Federal Parliament (Dewan Rakyat)

List of LMS district representatives in the State Legislative Assembly of Kelantan

Climate
Pasir Puteh has a tropical rainforest climate (Af) with moderate rainfall from February to April and heavy to very heavy rainfall in the remaining months.

References